John Gretton "Jocko" Willink (born September 8, 1971) is an American author, podcaster, and retired United States Navy officer who served in the Navy SEALs and is a former member of SEAL Team 3.

Willink's military service includes combat actions in the Iraq War, where he commanded SEAL Team 3's Task Unit Bruiser, the unit that fought in the battle against the Iraqi insurgents in Ramadi. Willink was honored with the Silver Star and Bronze Star Medal for his service. He achieved the rank of lieutenant commander.

Willink co-authored the books Extreme Ownership and The Dichotomy of Leadership (with fellow retired SEAL Leif Babin) and co-founded the management consulting firm Echelon Front, LLC. Willink hosts a weekly podcast with Brazilian jiu-jitsu practitioner Echo Charles, called the Jocko Podcast. He holds a B.A. in English from the University of San Diego.

Military career

After Navy recruit training and Radioman (RM) "A" School training, Willink reported to Basic Underwater Demolition/SEAL training (BUD/S) training at Naval Amphibious Base Coronado. Willink graduated BUD/S class 177. Following SEAL tactical training (STT) and completion of six-month probationary period, he received the NEC 5326 as a combatant swimmer (SEAL), entitled to wear the SEAL insignia. Willink served eight years on active duty, as an enlisted Navy SEAL with SEAL Team One and SEAL Team Two. Willink was part of the SEAL team that seized the Russian Tanker Volga-Neft-147 in the Gulf of Oman, which was carrying Iraqi oil in violation of a United Nations economic embargo. Willink earned his commission via Officer Candidate School and served as a platoon commander. Willink completed multiple deployments to Asia, the Middle East and Europe. During Operation Iraqi Freedom he deployed to the Iraqi city of Ramadi in 2006 with SEAL Team Three as commander of Task Unit Bruiser, which included Leif Babin, Seth "Stoner" Stone, Marc Alan Lee, Michael Monsoor, Jonny Kim, Kevin Lacz, Ryan "Biggles" Job, JP Dinnell, Tony Eafrati, Jason Hogan and Chris Kyle. Willink also served as a Navy SEAL instructor during his career. He retired in October 2010 after 20 years of service.

Post-Navy career
After retiring from the Navy, Willink co-founded the leadership consulting firm Echelon Front along with Leif Babin, who served with him in the SEAL Teams. He and Babin also co-authored the leadership manual Extreme Ownership: How U.S. Navy Seals Lead and Win. After appearing on the podcasts of Tim Ferriss, Joe Rogan, and Sam Harris to publicize his book, Willink started his own weekly podcast, The Jocko Podcast.

In addition to his work in consulting and authorship, Willink instructs jiu-jitsu at Victory MMA & Fitness in San Diego and co-owns Origin USA, a company based in Farmington, Maine, which produces lifestyle apparel, nutrition supplements, and fitness equipment, as well as being one of the only manufacturers of jiu-jitsu gis in the United States. Willink has a chapter giving advice in Tim Ferriss' book Tools of Titans.

Brazilian Jiu-jitsu career
Willink started Brazilian jiu-jitsu under Fabio Santos while in active service and continued training after retirement from the military. He obtained his black belt from Dean Lister. Since then, Willink has been a prominent figure in the sport and has taught many grapplers. Willink promoted his own daughter to blue belt in Brazilian jiu-jitsu in September 2022.

Bibliography

Adult nonfiction
Extreme Ownership: How U.S. Navy Seals Lead and Win (2015)
Discipline Equals Freedom: Field Manual (2017)
The Dichotomy of Leadership: Balancing the Challenges of Extreme Ownership to Lead and Win (2018)
Leadership Strategy and Tactics: Field Manual (2020)
The Code. The Evaluation. The Protocols: Striving to Become an Eminently Qualified Human (2020)

Adult fiction
Final Spin: A  Novel (2021)

Children's books
Mikey and the Dragons (2018)

Way of the Warrior Kid (2017–2021)
 The Way of the Warrior Kid (2017)
 Marc's Mission: Way of the Warrior Kid (2018)
 Way of the Warrior Kid 3: Where there's a Will...  (2019)
 Way of the Warrior Kid 4: Field Manual (2021)

Awards and decorations

References

External links

Jocko Podcast
The Unravelling with Jocko Willink and Darryl Cooper
Echelon Front
Victory MMA

1971 births
Living people
20th-century American naval officers
21st-century American naval officers
United States Navy personnel of the Iraq War
United States Navy personnel of the War in Afghanistan (2001–2021)
United States Navy SEALs personnel
Recipients of the Silver Star
Recipients of the Meritorious Service Medal (United States)
Recipients of the Humanitarian Service Medal
American podcasters
American people of Dutch descent
American practitioners of Brazilian jiu-jitsu
People awarded a black belt in Brazilian jiu-jitsu
Brazilian jiu-jitsu trainers
People from Torrington, Connecticut
Military personnel from Connecticut